Aberlady railway station served the village of Aberlady in Scotland. It was served by the Aberlady, Gullane and North Berwick railway. This line diverged from the East Coast Main Line at Aberlady Junction, east of the current Longniddry station.

History

The station had one platform on the north side of a passing loop, there were two sidings behind the platform forming a goods yard able to accommodate most types of goods including live stock, it was equipped with a two and a half ton crane.

The line and station were absorbed by the North British Railway on 6 August 1900. Then station passed on to the London and North Eastern Railway (LNER) during the Grouping of 1923. That company then withdrew passenger services nine years later, although the line was still open to freight until 1964.

The station building was used as by the LNER as a camping apartment from 1935. The Scottish Region continued this use of the buildings, sometimes marketed as Camping Cottages in the 1950s and up to the line closing in 1964.

Despite being closed the station had been the location of a Camping coach in 1956, 1957 and from 1961 to 1964.

Notes

Sources

Further reading

External links
 RAILSCOT on Aberlady, Gullane and North Berwick Railway
 East Lothian Museums on Aberlady, Gullane and North Berwick Railway 
 Model of the Station on Youtube
 Aberlady station on navigable O. S. map

Disused railway stations in East Lothian
Former North British Railway stations
Railway stations in Great Britain opened in 1898
Railway stations in Great Britain closed in 1932
1898 establishments in Scotland
1932 disestablishments in Scotland